Abdelghani Demmou (born January 29, 1989) is an Algerian football player who currently plays for MC Alger in the Algerian Ligue Professionnelle 1. He commonly plays as a centre back.

Club career
In the summer of 2009, Demmou was linked with a move to MC Oran. However, his club, SA Mohammadia, refused to sell the player.

In the summer of 2010, Demmou was again linked with a move away from his club, this time to USM El Harrach. SA Mohammadia put a 5 million Algerian dinars price tag on the player. He ended up joining the club in July with the transfer details not disclosed.

On May 1, 2011, Demmou was a starter for USM El Harrach in the 2011 Algerian Cup Final against JS Kabylie. However, they ended up losing the match 1-0.
Demmou now plays for MC Alger, where he has won an Algerian Cup. MC Alger won the Final on 2 May 2016 against NA Hussein Dey (1-0).

International career
Demmou was called up to the senior Algeria squad for the 2017 Africa Cup of Nations qualifiers against Seychelles on 2 June 2016.

Honours
 Finalist of the Algerian Cup once with USM El Harrach in 2011

ES Sétif
 CAF Champions League: 2014
 CAF Super Cup: 2015
 Algerian Ligue Professionnelle 1: 2014–15
Algerian Cup with MC Alger: 2015–16

References

External links
 
 
 

1989 births
Living people
Algerian footballers
Algerian Ligue Professionnelle 1 players
USM El Harrach players
ES Sétif players
SA Mohammadia players
MC Alger players
People from Mohammadia, Mascara
Footballers at the 2016 Summer Olympics
Olympic footballers of Algeria
Association football defenders
21st-century Algerian people